The Waruta River is a river in northern Western Papua in the province of Papua, Indonesia. It is a tributary of the Taritatu River.

Geography
The river flows in the northern area of Papua with predominantly tropical rainforest climate (designated as Af in the Köppen-Geiger climate classification). The annual average temperature in the area is 21 °C. The warmest month is July, when the average temperature is around 22 °C, and the coldest is March, at 20 °C. The average annual rainfall is 3489 mm. The wettest month is March, with an average of 444 mm rainfall, and the driest is July, with 162 mm rainfall.

See also
List of rivers of Indonesia
List of rivers of Western New Guinea

References

Rivers of Papua (province)
Rivers of Indonesia